Between Two Evils is the debut extended play (EP) by American singer and Danity Kane member Aubrey O'Day. It was released on August 13, 2013.

The track "DJT" is believed to be about O'Day's affair with Donald Trump Jr. In 2013, O'Day stated that "DJT" was based on a real conversation and was named for the man she wrote the album about.

Commercial performance
The album debuted at number 131 on the Billboard 200 chart, with first-week sales of 5,000 copies in the United States. The album also peaked at number three on the Billboard Heatseekers chart and number twenty-five on the  Billboard Independent Albums chart.

Track listing

Charts

References 

2013 debut EPs
Self-released EPs